Degii (Delgerjargal) Sodbaatar graduated from National University of Mongolia in 2000 with a degree in Korean language and culture. Later, she did a one-year course on Korean poetics at Kim Il Sung University in Pyongyang, North Korea. She then entered Dongguk University in South Korea as a graduate student, to pursue an MA in Buddhist studies.

In 2009, Degii spent three months in residence at Smith College as part of a Mongolian art and culture exchange, and a one-month residence at Indiana University Bloomington. Then in 2010-11 she did a six-month internship at the Olcott Institute of the Theosophical Society of America, Wheaton, Ill., to upgrade her English translation skills.

In Mongolia, she worked as publications manager at Maitri Books, and also ran a small travel company for people wishing to visit the Buddhist power places in the country. She is a permanent member of the Board of Directors of the Kim Ill Jung Flower Growers Association of Mongolia, as well as a member of the Board of Advisors of the America Mongolia Friendship Society.

Her first book was her translation and publication of a bilingual edition of the Blavatsky classic, The Voice of the Silence, for the Nicholas Roerich Society of Mongolia.

She also oversaw the editing work and publication of Michael Kohn's Lama of the Gobi, a study of the life, legends, and works of the great 19th century Mongolian mystic Danzan Rabjaa, the fifth incarnation of the great Gelukpa lama known as the Noyon Hutuktu.

Her most recent book is titled Reflections of a Mongolian Shaman, a translation of the writings from the famous Mongolian shaman Byampadorj Dondog.  He was born in 1947 in Darvi Sum of Hovd Amaig, southwest Mongolia, in a maternal lineage descended from the tribe of the wife of Chinggis Haan (Genghis Khan). This was the harsh era of the Stalinist purges, when Mongolia was a satellite of the Soviets, and thus he grew up during a period when both Buddhism and Shamanism were oppressed to the point of near extinction. In his youth he secretly trained in the ancient shamanic arts under several underground masters, and when Communism fell in 1990 he emerged as a principal force in the efforts of cultural and spiritual restoration.

Degii is presently working on her third book, Lojong: A Modern Perspective from a Mongolian Woman.

References

Living people
Buddhist translators
Mongolian translators
Tibetan Buddhists from Mongolia
Year of birth missing (living people)
National University of Mongolia alumni
Kim Il-sung University alumni
Dongguk University alumni